The Haunted Island may refer to:

The Haunted Island, a Frog Detective Game, a 2018 first-person comedy adventure video game
The Haunted Island (film), a 1988 comedy horror film directed by Sammo Hung
Haunted Island, a 1928 American silent action film serial directed by Robert F. Hill